The Heart Exposed is a Canadian drama film, directed by Jean-Yves Laforce and released in 1987. Written by Michel Tremblay as an adaptation of his own novel The Heart Laid Bare (Le Cœur découvert), the film centres on the relationship between Jean-Marc (Gilles Renaud) and Mathieu (Michel Poirier), two gay men who meet and fall in love despite a ten-year age difference and the complication that Mathieu is the father of a five-year-old son.

The film's cast also includes Olivier Chasse, Louisette Dussault, Amulette Garneau, Louise Rinfret, Pierre Houle and Robert Lalonde.

The film premiered at the Montreal World Film Festival in 1987, but was distributed primarily as a television film broadcast by Télévision de Radio-Canada in November. It was later screened at the Frameline Film Festival in 1989, where it won the Audience Award.

Thomas Waugh, writing for Cinema Canada, stated that "It is a fine pleasure to see this warmhearted little gem, not only because of positive representation of gays in this year when everyone's gushing about Night Zoo, a violent misogynist derivative film that exults in queer-baiting and queer-smashing, but because one of our finest writers has made another all-too-rare visit to the screen."

References

External links

1987 films
1987 drama films
1987 LGBT-related films
1987 television films
Canadian drama television films
Canadian LGBT-related television films
Films based on Canadian novels
LGBT-related drama films
Quebec films
Works by Michel Tremblay
Gay-related films
1980s French-language films
French-language Canadian films
1980s Canadian films